San Jose College is a private Catholic primary and secondary school, located in Durango, Biscay, in the autonomous community of Basque Country, Spain. The school was founded by the Society of Jesus in 1885, and includes infant through baccalaureate. The school fosters the Basque culture and language, while also teaching Spanish and English.

See also

 Catholic Church in Spain
 Education in Spain
 List of Jesuit schools

References  

Jesuit secondary schools in Spain
Jesuit primary schools in Spain
Education in the Basque Country (autonomous community)
Educational institutions established in 1885
1885 establishments in Spain
Buildings and structures in Durango